Costante is a male Italian given name. Notable people with the name include:
Costante Adolfo Bossi (1876–1953), Italian organist, composer and teacher
Costante Bonazza (1924–1980), Polish-Italian footballer
Costante Degan (1930–1988), Italian politician
Costante Girardengo (1893–1978), Italian road bicycle racer
Costante Maltoni (1915–1980), Italian prelate of the Catholic Church
Costante Tencalla (1593–1646), Swiss-Italian architect and sculptor
Orazio Costante Grossoni (1867–1952), Italian sculptor
Pietro Costante Cardin (1922–2020), Italian-French fashion designer

See also
Stadio Costante Girardengo, a football stadium located in Novi Ligure, Italy

Masculine given names
Italian masculine given names